The list of shipwrecks in May 1877 includes ships sunk, foundered, grounded, or otherwise lost during May 1877.

1 May

2 May

3 May

4 May

6 May

7 May

8 May

9 May

10 May

11 May

12 May

13 May

14 May

{{shipwreck list item
|ship=East Goodwin Lightship, andWohldorf
|flag= Trinity House
|desc=The barque Wohldorf collided with the East Goodwin Lightship. Both vessels were severely damaged. Wohldorf was on a voyage from Kiel to Southampton, Hampshire, United Kingdom. She was towed in to Ramsgate, Kent, United Kingdom by the tug Rescue.
}}

15 May

16 May

17 May

18 May

19 May

20 May

21 May

22 May

23 May

24 May

25 May

26 May

27 May

28 May

29 May

30 May

31 May

Unknown date

References

Bibliography
Ingram, C. W. N., and Wheatley, P. O., (1936) Shipwrecks: New Zealand disasters 1795–1936.'' Dunedin, NZ: Dunedin Book Publishing Association.

1877-05
Maritime incidents in May 1877